Born to Be Blue is an album by jazz musician Freddie Hubbard recorded in December 1981 and released on the Pablo Today label in 1982.

Reception
The Allmusic review by Scott Yanow calls the album a "fine modern hard bop CD".

Track listing 
All compositions by Freddie Hubbard except where noted
 "Gibraltar" - 12:16
 "True Colors" - 8:05
 "Born to Be Blue" (Mel Tormé, Robert Wells) - 7:25
 "Joy Spring" (Clifford Brown) - 6:48
 "Up Jumped Spring" - 7:11
 Recorded on Soundstream Digital Systems at Ocean Way Recording Studio, Hollywood; December 14, 1981

Personnel 
 Freddie Hubbard - trumpet, flugelhorn
 Harold Land - tenor saxophone, flute
 Billy Childs - keyboards
 Larry Klein - bass
 Steve Houghton - drums
 Buck Clarke - percussion

References 

1982 albums
Pablo Records albums
Freddie Hubbard albums